The following is a list of the 21 cantons of the Lot-et-Garonne department, in France, following the French canton reorganisation which came into effect in March 2015:

 Agen-1
 Agen-2
 Agen-3
 Agen-4
 L'Albret
 Le Confluent
 Les Coteaux de Guyenne
 Les Forêts de Gascogne
 Le Fumélois
 Le Haut agenais Périgord
 Lavardac
 Le Livradais
 Marmande-1
 Marmande-2
 L'Ouest agenais
 Le Pays de Serres
 Le Sud-Est agenais
 Tonneins
 Le Val du Dropt
 Villeneuve-sur-Lot-1
 Villeneuve-sur-Lot-2

References